Kenneth Onwuka Dike  (17 December 1917 – 26 October 1983) was a Nigerian educationist, historian and the first Nigerian Vice-Chancellor of the nation's premier college, the University of Ibadan. During the Nigerian civil war, he moved to Harvard University. He was a founder of the Ibadan School that dominated the writing of the History of Nigeria until the 1970s. He is credited with "having played the leading role in creating a generation of African historians who could interpret their own history without being influenced by Eurocentric approaches."

Career 
Dike was born in Awka, eastern Nigeria. He attended Fourah Bay College, Sierra Leone and also Durham University for his BSc, the University of Aberdeen for his MA, and King's College London for his PhD. During the 1960s, as a member of the University of Ibadan's history department, he played a pioneering role in promoting African leadership of scholarly works published on Africa. As the head of the organizing committee of the First International Congress of Africanists in Ghana in 1963, he sought for a strengthened meticulous non-colonial focused African research, publication of research in various languages including indigenous and foreign, so as to introduce native speakers to history and for people to view African history through a common eye. He was the first director of International School Ibadan.
In 1965 he was elected chairman of the Association of Commonwealth Universities.
Ebere Nwaubani argues that Dike was the first modern scholarly proponent of Africanist history. His publications were a watershed in African historiography. Dike has been described as first African to get a PhD in history.

At the University College of Ibadan, he became the first African professor of history and head of a history department. He founded the Nigerian National Archives, and helped in the founding of the Historical Society of Nigeria. His book Trade and Politics in the Niger Delta 1830-1885 dealt with 19th-century economics politics in the Niger Delta. He focused on internal African factors, especially defensive measures undertaken by the delta societies against imperialist penetration. Dike helped create the Ibadan School of African history and promoted the use of oral evidence by African historians. Dike was also the first president of ASUTECH (Anambra State University of Technology, now Nnamdi Azikiwe University).

Publications 
His publications include the following: Report on the Preservation and Administration of Historical Records in Nigeria (1953), Trade and Politics in the Nigeria Delta 1830-1885 (1956), A Hundred Years of British Rule in Nigeria (1957), The Origins of the Niger Missions (1958).

Personal life
He and his wife, Ona had five children.

Gallery

References

Toyin Falola, The History of Nigeria, Greenwood Press, 1999.

1917 births
1983 deaths
Fourah Bay College alumni
Alumni of King's College London
Academic staff of the University of Ibadan
Harvard University faculty
20th-century Nigerian historians
Nigerian expatriate academics in the United States
Nigerian archivists
Historians of Nigeria
Vice-Chancellors of the University of Ibadan
Alumni of the University of Aberdeen
Igbo historians
Igbo academics
People from Anambra State
Founders of Nigerian schools and colleges
20th-century Nigerian educators
Nnamdi Azikiwe University people